Medway Archives holds the archives for Rochester upon Medway City Council and its predecessor authorities. The archives are held at the Civic Centre, Strood, Rochester, and run by Medway Council.

References

County record offices in England
Medway
History of Kent